Khurda Road  is an important railway junction station of East Coast Railway Zone in the Indian state of Odisha. It serves Jatani, which is also known as Khurda Road.

History

During the period 1893 to 1896,   of East Coast State Railway was built and opened to traffic. It necessitated construction of some of the largest bridges across rivers like Subarnarekha, Brahmani, Baitarani, Mahanadi, Kathajodi, Kuakhai and Birupa. Bengal Nagpur Railway's line to Cuttack was opened on 1 January 1899.

The Khurda Road–Puri section was opened to traffic on 1 February 1897.

Railway reorganization
The Bengal Nagpur Railway was nationalized in 1944. Eastern Railway was formed on 14 April 1952 with the portion of East Indian Railway Company east of Mughalsarai and the Bengal Nagpur Railway. In 1955, South Eastern Railway was carved out of Eastern Railway. It comprised lines mostly operated by BNR earlier. Amongst the new zones started in April 2003 were East Coast Railway and South East Central Railway. Both these railways were carved out of South Eastern Railway.

Railway Division
Khurda Road is one of the three divisions of East Coast Railway.

References

External links
 Trains at Khurda Road

Railway stations in Khorda district
Khurda Road railway division
Railway stations in India opened in 1897